Vincent Edward "Vince" Melamed is an American keyboardist and songwriter who resides in Southern California.He was born in New York, and moved to Los Angeles at an early age. Melamed has appeared with many bands as a keyboardist (Bob Dylan, J.D. Souther, Eagles, Jimmy Buffett, Dan Fogelberg, Glenn Frey, Rosanne Cash) and has co-written songs for other artists, including "Walkaway Joe" by Trisha Yearwood, "What Mattered Most" by Ty Herndon, "Tell Me What You Dream" by Restless Heart, "I'll Take That as a Yes (The Hot Tub Song)" by Phil Vassar, "The  and "She'd Give Anything" by Boy Howdy and Gerald Levert. Melamed has received numerous BMI Million Air awards.

In the early 1990s, he was part of Run C&W, with fellow musicians Jim Photoglo, Russell Smith of the Amazing Rhythm Aces and former Eagles member Bernie Leadon. He participated as a counselor for the 2005 Rock 'n Roll Fantasy Camp.

He now enjoys a career in VoiceOver featured in 2K Games Mafia III, Marvel Academy, Nintendo MarioKart 3 radio ad, countless video, and phone games, and commercials.

References

American country singer-songwriters
American keyboardists
Living people
Year of birth missing (living people)
Country musicians from New York (state)
Run C&W members
American male singer-songwriters
Singer-songwriters from New York (state)